KSJN (99.5 FM, "YourClassical MPR") is the flagship station of Minnesota Public Radio's classical music network, serving the Twin Cities region. KSJN's studios are located at the MPR Broadcast Center on Cedar Street in downtown St. Paul, while its transmitter is located on the KMSP Tower in Shoreview.

The 99.5 frequency was established as commercial radio station WLOL-FM in 1957; the station achieved its most success as a top-rated Top 40/CHR station during the 1980s. It was purchased by MPR in 1991.

Background

KSJN intellectual unit
Saint John's University in Collegeville, near St. Cloud, built and began operating the first station in the network, KSJR-FM (90.1), in January 1967. By 1968, however, it was obvious that there weren't enough listeners in the immediate St. Cloud area for the station to be viable. KSJR nearly tripled its power in hopes of reaching the Twin Cities, but even then it only provided grade B coverage of Minneapolis and completely missed St. Paul. To solve this problem, Saint John's signed on KSJN at 91.1 MHz, originally licensed to the northern Twin Cities suburb of New Brighton, as a full-time repeater of KSJR-FM.  By 1969, Saint John's realized it was in over its head operating a full-service radio station, so it turned over KSJR and KSJN to a nonprofit corporation, Saint John's University Broadcasting.  This organization later changed its name to Minnesota Educational Radio, and finally Minnesota Public Radio.

In 1969 and 1970, MPR assisted in the formation of National Public Radio and was a founding member of the organization.  Four years later, in 1974, the network began live broadcasting of Garrison Keillor's A Prairie Home Companion, one of the best-known programs on American public radio.

MPR made plans to establish a dedicated news/talk service as NPR's programming became more popular.  To that end, in 1980, it purchased WLOL (1330 AM) and changed its calls to KSJN.  In 1989, the AM station changed its calls to KNOW, a call sign used by an AM station in Austin, Texas for 50 years.  It began airing an expanded schedule of NPR programming, while the FM station continued to air a mix of NPR programming and classical music.

99.5 FM history 
On July 18, 1956, radio station WLOL (1330 AM) was granted a construction permit for a new radio station to broadcast on 99.5 MHz. The station, WLOL-FM, began broadcasting in February 1957, airing a classical music format. The station maintained the programming for its first 16 years of operation until the money-losing outlet was converted to an automated easy listening format in August 1973. The station donated its classical albums to KSJN and KUOM (770 AM); it also lost many of its sponsors with the change.

Ratings remained low as an easy listening station. When Midcontinent Broadcasting, the original owner of the FM, sold the WLOL pair to Bob Liggett of Liggett Broadcasting for $1.55 million in 1978, it sparked a format change. On August 20, Liggett, with a staff of nine new hires, led a flip to adult contemporary as Easy Rockin' FM 100 WLOL, bringing the station into competition with KSTP-FM and WCCO-FM. Ratings rose, but the station remained far off its direct competition.

Top 40/CHR era
On December 12, 1981, WLOL-FM changed formats again, this time to Top 40/CHR as 99½ WLOL. The ratings effect was quick to take hold; in the spring 1982 Arbitron survey, WLOL-FM more than doubled its performance and vaulted into third place in the Twin Cities, led by the revamped "Hines and Berglund" morning show hosted by John Hines and Bob Berglund.

Even while WLOL was surging, a sale was in the works. In 1982, an Indianapolis-based consortium headed by Jeff Smulyan acquired WLOL-FM for $6 million, a record price at the time for a Minnesota radio station. It was the first station purchase for Emmis Communications, which then bought two more stations the next year. The station peaked in the ratings in 1984 with a 9.9 share, closely behind second-place KSTP-FM and well ahead of direct format competitor KDWB. WLOL and KDWB would go on to have a bitter rivalry throughout the 1980s, with WLOL dominating the format in the Twin Cities for the next five years.

WLOL was noteworthy for its presentation, by combining typical Top 40 programming philosophies with a local touch. In addition, WLOL relied heavily on unique jingle packages, including the now iconic "Get Me Up!" jingle, which was written by Kyrl Henderson of the now defunct Reel Good Productions, and was distributed to stations across the country. Local artists such as Prince & The Revolution, Morris Day & The Time, Information Society, Alexander O'Neal and The Jets all received support from WLOL.

By the late 1980s, the tables were turned. After KDWB updated its on-air presentation in 1988, some listeners felt WLOL had grown stale, while KDWB suddenly became the hip new CHR station. KDWB and its morning show host, Steve Cochran, jumped ahead of a slumping WLOL and would, from that point on, be the dominant CHR station in the market. Playing catch-up, WLOL started tweaking the programming and air staff, shook up its longtime morning show, and finally, on May 11, 1990, moved to a Rhythmic Top 40 format. Labeling itself as "Today's Best Music", the new 99.5 WLOL hired a new airstaff and rejuvenated itself in the minds of listeners, managing a ratings improvement.

KSJN and KNOW relocation

In 1989, Smulyan bought the Seattle Mariners baseball team. As early as September 1989, rumors were swirling that WLOL might be up for sale to raise funds for the acquisition; it later emerged that Emmis had indeed placed the station on the market at that time.

On December 26, 1990—realizing an ambition held for over a decade—Minnesota Public Radio announced the purchase of the WLOL facility for $12 million, to give it two FM frequencies. MPR had been operating two stations since it had bought 1330 kHz—the former WLOL AM—in 1981. It would sell that station, by that time known as KNOW, to raise some of the funds for the FM purchase. For Emmis, it was a discount on the original asking price of $20 million, which a slowing economy had put out of reach.

MPR announced that it would move its classical programming to the 99.5 frequency, which had a stronger signal than its existing station at 91.1. That frequency would become the new home of KNOW, the MPR news station. While Emmis made some steps toward enabling another station to pick up WLOL wholesale, going as far as to provide such a blueprint to other FM stations in the Twin Cities market, 1330 AM had been challenged by a poor signal in the western suburbs that were home to many MPR members, as well as in office buildings. Pop music fans in the Twin Cities were furious as WLOL slowly counted down to its last day, February 26, 1991. WLOL's final day culminated with a day-long farewell, playing music and jingles from the station's nearly 10 year-long Top 40/CHR era, as well as current and former airstaff offering farewell messages, and advertisements from 92 KQRS, K102 (where morning host John Hines later landed) and even KDWB redirecting listeners to their stations. At 6:30 p.m., WLOL signed off with a half-hour montage of clips from songs played by the station during the Top 40/CHR era, followed by a sign-off announcement from Hines and "Miss You Much" by Janet Jackson. At 7 p.m., after about a half hour of dead air, WLOL started playing music without live DJs for about an hour (with more liners in between from KDWB wishing WLOL "happy trails" and redirecting listeners to their station), after which it officially signed off with 1999 by Minneapolis native Prince fading out as WLOL ended after 34 years of serving the Twin Cities. The next morning, 99.5 became the new home of KSJN, which began playing classical music 24 hours a day. The KNOW call sign, along with all NPR news and talk programming, moved to 91.1. (The KSJN call letters officially moved to 99.5 (along with the KNOW-FM calls being instituted on 91.1) on March 11.)

The historic WLOL call letters were soon claimed by KXLV, a station located north of the Twin Cities in Cambridge at 105.3 FM. When the station was purchased and turned into WREV, the call sign was parked on KZTG (1470 AM). They were then used on 100.3 MHz from 1999 to 2003 and were restored to the 1330 AM frequency in 2005.

In 2005, KSJN was the first MPR station to broadcast regularly with the digital HD Radio system. KSJN currently features the Classical 24 feed on its HD2 subchannel.

References

Further reading
 Mark Durenberger (1999).  Early quad-casts and other fun.  The Broadcast Archive: War Stories.
 Julio Ojeda-Zapata (June 16, 2005). Digital revolution spreads to radio. Saint Paul Pioneer Press.

External links

 99½ WLOL Minneapolis/St. Paul tribute page
 A recollection by Jim Stokes, an announcer during WLOL-FM's classical music phase

Minnesota Public Radio
Classical music radio stations in the United States
Radio stations in Minneapolis–Saint Paul
NPR member stations
Radio stations established in 1957
1957 establishments in Minnesota